Mariliana ocularis is a species of beetle in the family Cerambycidae. It was described by Hope in 1846. It is known from Argentina and Brazil.

References

Hemilophini
Beetles described in 1846